Partinico (Sicilian: Partinicu, Ancient Greek: Parthenikòn, Παρθενικόν) is a city and comune in the Metropolitan City of Palermo, Sicily, southern Italy.

Main sights

Church of San Giuseppe, housing 17th-century paintings.
Neo-Classicist Chiosco della Musica.
Baroque fountain.
Real Cantina Borbonica.

Notable people and places
The father of American musician Frank Zappa was born in Partinico. The street Via Zammatà where the Zappa family once lived, was later renamed to Via Frank Zappa. In 2015 Zappa's son Dweezil released an album titled Via Zammata'.

The Italian prime minister Vittorio Emanuele Orlando represented Partinico in the Italian Parliament from 1897 until 1925.
 	
Danilo Dolci was an Italian social activist, sociologist, popular educator and poet, and for some time resident at Partinico.

The local, family-run, anti-Mafia television station Telejato is based in the city/town.

See also
Sanctuary of Madonna del Ponte

Gallery

References

External links

Comune di Partinico